Andrew George Parker (born January 1969) is a British businessman, and the CEO of Capita from March 2014 to September 2017.

Early life
Andrew George Parker was born in January 1969.

Career
He was the CEO of Capita from March 2014, having joined the company in 2001.  He resigned or was ousted in March 2017, following a 33% drop in pre-tax profits, and Capita's relegation from the FTSE-100 index, but remained in post until 15 September.

References

1969 births
British businesspeople
Living people